Duncan Madsen is a former Scottish rugby union footballer.

He was capped by Scotland and was part of the 1976 & 1977 Gosforth team that won the 1975–76 John Player Cup and the 1976–77 John Player Cup.

References

Living people
Scottish rugby union players
Year of birth missing (living people)
Newcastle Falcons players
Scotland international rugby union players
Rugby union hookers